Cecilia Torudd (born 1942) is a Swedish illustrator and author born in Lund. Since the 1970s, she has been a contributing illustrator for the children's magazine Kamratposten.

Background
She is the daughter of Albert Levan, and Karin Malmberg. She studied Art Education at Konstfack, University College of Art, Crafts and Design in Stockholm, and is the author of Ensamma mamman. She is also known for her long standing contributions to Kamratposten.

Familjeliv 
Torudd's cartoon series Familjeliv (Family Life) was published in Kamratposten as a recurring feature during the 1980s. The series tells the story of the Larsson family, which consists of father Kenneth, mother Lisbet, the three children Lotta, Johan and Lillen and the dog Kalle. In the humorous series, she has portrayed everyday life with self-irony and from a female perspective.

Ensamma mamman 
Torudd's most famous series is The Lonely Mother, a humorous strip series that depicts everyday life from a female perspective. The series debuted in Dagens Nyheter's guest series section "DN series" in the autumn of 1985 and later returned as a daily series. It has since been collected in two serial albums and a number of later collection editions. A total of 500 comic strips were drawn over a period of three years and the series was published in a number of Swedish newspapers.

In 1989, Torudd received the Seriefrämjandet Urhunden Prize for Ensamma Mamman. The jury stated, "The Lonely Mother is a series that everyone – and that is, everyone – reads. It does not contain fancy adventures or glamorous heroes, but everyone can recognize themselves in it. Cecilia Torudd addresses the people of reality and "meets with body language and lines constantly in the middle of nowhere. The most rewritten series of recent years has succeeded with the piece of art in making the boring everyday life insanely amusing."

Other Works 
Torud has written books, including Livet är ett helvete (Life is Hell) in 2001 and I huvudet på en gammal hagga (In the Head of an Old Hagga) in 2005. She wrote the script for the play Kunde prästänkan så kan väl du starring Pia Green which toured around Sweden from 1990 to 1994.

Everyday life with grandparents is the subject of a series of toddler books named En dag.... The first title in the series was (A Day with Grandma: The Train Home) (2015).

Bibliography 
 Daghemmet Rödmyran, 1982 (tillsammans med Siv Widerberg)
 Den stora systern, 1985 (tillsammans med Siv Widerberg)
 Flickan som inte ville gå till dagis, 1986 (tills. med Siv Widerberg)
 Familjeliv
 Familjeliv (Rabén & Sjögren, 1986)
 Mera familjeliv (Rabén & Sjögren, 1989)
 Ännu mera familjeliv, 1994
 Ensamma mamman
 Ensamma mamman (Rabén & Sjögren, 1988)
 Mera Ensamma mamman (Rabén & Sjögren, 1989)
 Boken med ensamma mamman, 1994
 Ensamma mamman och andra berättelser, 1999
 Ensamma mamman och annat genialt, 2008
 Ensamma mamman och annat att fnissa åt, 2008
 Ensamma mamman och andra roligheter, 2008
 Ensamma mamman och annat mitt i prick, 2009
 Ensamma mamman och annat kul och tänkvärt, 2010
 Med Sverige i tiden (Rabén & Sjögren, 1991)
 Vi måste bada!, 1995
 Korv till middag, 1995
 Pinnen, 1996
 Jätteskriket, 1996
 Trollpappan, 2000
 Livet är ett helvete, 2001
 Hjälp jag blöder, 2002
 Pirr i magen klump i halsen, 2003 (tillsammans med Annika Thor)
 I huvudet på en gammal hagga, 2005
 En dag…
 En dag med mormor: tåget hem, 2015
 En dag med morfar : sova borta, 2015
 En dag med farmor : snabbkalaset, 2016
 En dag med farfar : vi leker, 2016

References

External links
 Lambiek Comiclopedia article.

1942 births
Living people
Swedish cartoonists
Swedish women cartoonists
Swedish illustrators
Swedish comics artists
Swedish women illustrators
Konstfack alumni